Caroline Hunt (1865-1927) was an American home economist. Appointed Professor of Home Economics at the University of Wisconsin in 1903, Hunt was forced to resign in 1908.

References

1865 births
1927 deaths
Home economics
University of Wisconsin–Madison faculty
Date of birth missing